Indonesia made its Paralympic Games debut at the 1976 Summer Paralympics in Toronto, with competitors in athletics, lawn bowls, swimming and table tennis. The country has participated in every subsequent edition of the Summer Paralympics, except 1992, but has never taken part in the Winter Paralympics.

As of 2020 edition, Indonesians have won a total of twenty-seven Paralympic medals: six gold, seven silver and fourteen bronze. The country's first two gold medals were won in 1976, by Itria Dini in the men's precision javelin (category F), and by Syarifuddin in the men's singles in lawn bowls (category E). Yan Soebiyanto won Indonesia's third gold medal in that same event four years later, while R.S. Arlen took gold in weightlifting, in the men's featherweight amputee category. In addition to these gold medals, Indonesians won a silver and three bronzes in 1976, and four bronze in 1980. 1984 yielded a silver medal and a bronze, but no gold, while in 1988 Indonesia won two silver medals. 

After its absence in 1992, Indonesia sent significantly smaller delegations to the Paralympics, and no Indonesian won a Paralympic medal until the 2012 Paralympic Games. Indonesia sent four athletes to the 2012 Paralympic Games, and David Jacobs won bronze in the Table Tennis - Men's Individual C10 classification. 

In Rio de Janeiro 2016, Indonesia got its only medal from powerlifting after Ni Nengah Widiasih successfully lifted 95 kg. She was also won silver at the 2020 Summer Paralympics in Tokyo, Japan, the first silver medalist since 1988. In the latter Games, Indonesia won two gold medals, ended a long wait gold for over 40 years. All gold medals won by Leani Ratri Oktila with her partners; Khalimatus Sadiyah in women's doubles SL3-SU5 and Hary Susanto in mixed doubles SL3-SU5; both of them became the youngest and oldest Indonesian para badminton player to win a Paralympic gold medal, respectively.

Medal tables

Medals by Summer Games

Medals by Winter Games

Medals by sports

Medals by Summer Sports

List of medalists

Medals by individual 
According to official data of the International Paralympic Committee. This is a list of people who have won two or more Paralympic medals for Indonesia.

 People in bold are still active competitors

Paralympics participants

Summer Paralympics

Flag bearers

Notes

See also
 Olympic Games
 Paralympic Games
 Indonesia at the Deaflympics
 Indonesia at the Olympics
 Indonesia at the Youth Olympics
 List of flag bearers for Indonesia at the Olympics

References

 
Olympic competitors for Indonesia
Paralympic competitors for Indonesia